Naftoport Sp. z o.o. is a Polish company which manages crude oil shipment and deliveries. It is located in Gdańsk, Poland. Naftoport was established in June 1991 by several Polish oil companies and Marine Commercial Port in Gdansk. The company oversees operations of the terminal for reloading of crude oil and products in the Port of Gdańsk.

Ownership
The company is owned by number of companies, including all the major oil companies in Poland:
PERN Przyjaźń SA	
PKN Orlen SA	
Grupa Lotos SA	
Gdańsk Port Północny	
J&S Service & Investment
State Treasury
	 
PERN Przyjazn SA holds the controlling stake of 68% in Naftoport.

Oil terminal
The terminal was built in 1990s to diversify Poland's oil imports.  The terminal loading capacity is 34 million tonnes of crude oil per year. The operations are a part of larger pipeline system for transportation of crude oil to Polish and German refineries from Russia, mainly through Druzhba pipeline. The annual capacity of the terminal is 23 million tonnes of oil and oil products. PERN Przyjazn SA officials claimed they would increase the capacity of the sea terminal to 50 million tonnes if the main source of onshore pipeline system handled by PERN, Druzhba Pipeline is shut down.

Significance
Polish and German refineries depend on Russian oil coming mainly through Druzhba pipeline. Unlike natural gas, crude oil can be imported to Poland through the terminal in Gdansk. Polish authorities claim they are prepared for oil imports from other suppliers through this terminal if oil supplies from Russia are disrupted. Besides the imports through Druzhba pipeline, Poland currently imports Russian oil coming from Russian enclave of Kaliningrad through Naftoport terminal as well.

See also
Gdańsk Shipyard

References

External links
Official website of Naftoport
Official website of PERN Przyjazn SA

Energy companies established in 1991
Energy in Poland
Oil and gas companies of Poland
Oil terminals
Polish brands
Polish companies established in 1991
Transport companies established in 1991